Elspe is a right tributary of the Volme river in Germany. Its source  is at 413 metres above sea-level near Brenscheid, just south of Piepersloh, a part of the city Lüdenscheid. It empties at 270 metres above sea-level into the Volme in Brügge, another part of Lüdenscheid. The Elspe is separated from the Lüdenscheid's built up area by the Nurre mountain range. It makes two 90° turns.

Notable buildings in the Elspe valley are Schloß Neuenhof (Neuenhof Castle) and the Elspe works of the Hueck continuous aluminium casting factory.

References

Rivers of North Rhine-Westphalia
Lüdenscheid
Rivers of Germany